Jo Sung-mo (born March 11, 1977) is a South Korean pop ballad singer. He debuted in 1998 with the album To Heaven, and went on to release several of the all-time best-selling albums in South Korea.

Biography 
Jo Sung Mo was born in Seoul in 1977.

Shortly after high school, he was part of a dance group called 4004 (also called 4Angels). The dance group never had an official debut before disbanding.

Jo Sung Mo debuted in September 1998. He chose an unconventional method of releasing no information about the album or himself featuring actors (Lee Byeong Heon and Kim Ha Neul) in his debut instead of personally appearing in the video. It became known as the "mysterious concept".

His gamble paid off, and he became widely popular. Listed as one of the top sellers of Korean albums of all time, he earned the title "Crown Prince of Ballads".

Jo Sung Mo entered mandatory enlistment on March 30, 2006, and completed his service on May 23, 2008.

Jo Sung Mo got married in 2010 to former model and designer, Goo Min Ji. They met in 2007 and dated for 3 years prior. They had their first child, a boy, on October 26, 2015.

His fan club goes by the name Sungmo Maria.

Controversy 
In 2015, Jo was taken to court over breech of contract and substandard performances for his 2014–2015 concert tour. He was originally agreed to hold 18 concerts, but he stopped after 16 due to a discrepancy with the performance agency over money. On October 25, 2015, the Seoul Central District Court ruled against Jo and ordered him to pay 100 million won ($890,000 US) to the production house.

Discography

Studio albums

Compilation albums

Extended plays

Filmography

Television

Film
 Taegukgi (2004) as a soldier of the North Korean People's Army (Cameo)

Awards and nominations

Golden Disc Awards

KBS Music Awards

Mnet Asian Music Awards

Seoul Music Awards

See also 
 List of best-selling albums in South Korea

References 

Grand Prize Golden Disc Award recipients
Grand Prize Seoul Music Award recipients
South Korean pop singers
1977 births
South Korean male film actors
South Korean male television actors
Living people
MAMA Award winners
21st-century South Korean male  singers